Saint-Divy is a commune in the Finistère department of Brittany in north-western France.

Population
Inhabitants of Saint-Divy are called in French Saint-Divyens.

See also
Communes of the Finistère department
Saint Divy Parish close

References

External links

Official website 

Mayors of Finistère Association 

Communes of Finistère